OG3NE is a Dutch three-piece music group. The group is made up of sisters Lisa, Amy, and Shelley Vol, the latter two of the three being fraternal twins.

In 2007, they represented the Netherlands in the Junior Eurovision Song Contest 2007 with the song "Adem in, adem uit" ("Breathe In, Breathe Out"). On 19 December 2014, they were announced as the winners of season five of The Voice of Holland, earning a recording contract with EMI. They became the first trio to win the competition on any international version of The Voice.

On 29 October 2016, it was announced that they would represent the Netherlands in the Eurovision Song Contest 2017. On 2 March 2017, it was revealed that they would sing the song, "Lights and Shadows". They qualified from the semifinals and ultimately placed eleventh in the final, scoring 150 points.

Early life
The sisters were born in Dordrecht, and raised in Fijnaart.

Their father is Rick Vol, a music producer who also has written all the songs for his daughters.

Career

2007–2011: 300% and Sweet 16
In 2007, they won Junior Songfestival 2007 with their self-written song "Adem in, adem uit", earning a maximum score of 36 points in the semi-final and final. They went on to represent the Netherlands at the Junior Eurovision Song Contest 2007 in Rotterdam, where they placed eleventh out of seventeen. The following year, they released an album titled 300% and later released another album titled Sweet 16 in 2011.

2014–2016: The Voice of Holland, breakthrough, and We Got This
After a brief hiatus after the release of their second studio album in 2011, the group was featured in the third episode of the blind auditions of season five of The Voice of Holland under the new name "OG3NE". They performed Bee Gees's "Emotion" and had all four judges turn their chairs for them, eventually joining Marco Borsato's team. They were consistent throughout the whole show, eventually going on to win the show, becoming the first group to do so. In 2016, they competed in the Dutch musical television show De beste zangers van Nederland. They released their third studio album, We Got This, on 30 September 2016. It peaked at number-one on the Dutch albums chart.

2016–present: Eurovision Song Contest 2017

After much speculation, it was revealed on 29 October 2016 that OG3NE would be representing the Netherlands at the Eurovision Song Contest 2017, in Kyiv. Their entry, "Lights and Shadows", was released on 3 March 2017. They qualified from the semifinals and ultimately placed eleventh in the final, scoring 150 points.

Discography

Studio albums

Live albums

Extended plays

Singles

As lead artist

As featured artist

Promotional singles

References

Notes

Sources

External links
 

Musical groups established in 2007
Junior Eurovision Song Contest entrants for the Netherlands
Eurovision Song Contest entrants of 2017
Eurovision Song Contest entrants for the Netherlands
Dutch pop music groups
Dutch girl groups
People from Dordrecht
The Voice (franchise) winners
Dutch child singers
Sibling musical trios
People from Moerdijk
21st-century Dutch women singers
21st-century Dutch singers